Roy Eugene Rose (August 15, 1913 – January 16, 1986) was an American football end in the National Football League (NFL) for the New York Giants.  He played college football at the University of Tennessee and was drafted in the fourth round of the 1936 NFL Draft.

References

External links
 

1913 births
1986 deaths
American football ends
New York Giants players
Tennessee Volunteers football players
Players of American football from Cincinnati